Flexiseps alluaudi is a species of skink, a lizard in the family Scincidae. The species is endemic to Madagascar.

Etymology
The specific name, alluaudi, is in honor of French entomologist Charles Alluaud.

Habitat
The preferred natural habitat of F. alluaudi is forest.

Reproduction
The mode of reproduction of F. alluaudi is unknown.

References

Further reading
Brygoo ER (1981). "Systématique des lézards scincides de la région malgache. 6. Deux scincines nouveaux ". Bulletin du Muséum national d'histoire naturelle de Paris, Section A Zoologie Biologie et Écologie Animales, quatrième série [Series 4] 3 (1): 261–268. (Scelotes alluaudi, new species). (in French).
Erens J, Miralles A, Glaw F, Chatrou LW, Vences M (2017). "Extended molecular phylogenetics and revised systematics of Malagasy scincine lizards". Molecular Phylogenetics and Evolution 107: 466–472. (Flexiseps alluaudi, new combination).
Glaw F, Vences M (2006). A Field Guide to the Amphibians and Reptiles of Madagascar, Third Edition. Cologne, Germany: Vences & Glaw Verlag. 496 pp. .

Reptiles of Madagascar
Reptiles described in 1981
Flexiseps
Taxa named by Édouard-Raoul Brygoo
Taxobox binomials not recognized by IUCN